Mark Pegenia Salazar (born September 26, 1977) is a Filipino journalist, television news producer, newscaster, field reporter, & host. He is currently serving as the co-host of iJuander on GTV and the radio program Usap Tayo: Super Kwentuhan with Mark and Susan on DZBB-AM, both alongside Susan Enriquez.

Career 
Salazar started out as a news producer of GMA Network in 2001. He became part of GMA News as a journalist since 2005. He was also an associate producer for 24 Oras Weekend.

He anchored Balita Pilipinas Ngayon with Maki Pulido from 2011 until its conclusion on 2019. Salazar also anchored the weekend edition of Balitanghali with Mav Gonzales, replacing the original anchors Mariz Umali and Jun Veneracion who both left. The weekend newscast was cancelled in March 2020 due to COVID-19 pandemic.

On 2021, he joined Susan Enriquez as the co-host of iJuander, two years after Enriquez went solo due to the passing of her original co-host, Cesar Apolinario.

References 

1977 births
Living people
Filipino television journalists
GMA Network personalities
GMA Integrated News and Public Affairs people